In J. R. R. Tolkien's Middle-earth, the Eagles or Great Eagles, were immense birds that were sapient and could speak. The Great Eagles resembled actual eagles, but were much larger. Elsewhere, the Eagles have varied in nature and size both within Tolkien's writings and in later adaptations.

Scholars have noticed that the Eagles appear as agents of eucatastrophe or deus ex machina throughout Tolkien's writings, from The Silmarillion and the accounts of Númenor to The Hobbit and The Lord of the Rings. Where Elves are good, and fully sentient, and Orcs bad, Eagles and other races are in between; the Hobbit Bilbo Baggins fears he will become their supper, torn up like a rabbit, and is indeed served rabbit for supper. The scholar Marjorie Burns notes, too, that Gandalf's association with Eagles is reminiscent of the god Odin in Norse mythology. Others have seen Biblical echoes, especially when the Eagle-messenger sings of the final victory to Faramir in phrases reminiscent of Psalm 24.

Context 

J. R. R. Tolkien was an English author and philologist of ancient Germanic languages, specialising in Old English; he spent much of his career as a professor at the University of Oxford. He is best known for his novels about his invented Middle-earth, The Hobbit and The Lord of the Rings, and for the posthumously published The Silmarillion which provides a more mythical narrative about earlier ages. He invented several peoples for Middle-earth, including Elves, Dwarves, Hobbits, Orcs, Trolls, and Eagles, among others. A devout Roman Catholic, he described The Lord of the Rings as "a fundamentally religious and Catholic work", rich in Christian symbolism.

Appearances

First Age 

Throughout The Silmarillion, the Eagles are associated with Manwë, the ruler of the sky and Lord of the Valar. It is stated that "spirits in the shape of hawks and eagles" brought news from Middle-earth to his halls upon Taniquetil, the highest mountain in Valinor, and in the Valaquenta of "all swift birds, strong of wing". Upon their first appearance in the main narrative, it is stated that the Eagles had been "sent forth" to Middle-earth by Manwë, to live in the mountains north of the land of Beleriand, to "watch upon" Morgoth, and to help the exiled Noldorin Elves "in extreme cases". The Eagles were ruled by Thorondor, "Lord of the Eagles", and "mightiest of all birds that have ever been". When Turgon built the Hidden City of Gondolin, the eagles of Thorondor became his allies, bringing him news and keeping spies and Orcs away. The eagles' watch was redoubled after the coming of Tuor, enabling Gondolin to remain undiscovered longer than any other Elvish kingdom in Beleriand. When the city fell, the eagles protected the fugitives from ambushing orcs. The Eagles fought alongside the army of the Valar, Elves, and Men during the War of Wrath at the end of the First Age. In The Silmarillion it is recounted that after the appearance of winged dragons, "all the great birds of heaven" gathered under the leadership of Thorondor to Eärendil, and destroyed the majority of the dragons in an aerial battle.

Second Age 

On the island of Númenor in the Second Age, three Eagles guarded the summit of the holy mountain Meneltarma, appearing whenever anyone approached it, and staying in the sky during the Númenórean "Three Prayers" religious ceremony. The Númenóreans called them "the Witnesses of Manwë", believing he had sent them from Aman "to keep watch upon the Holy Mountain and upon all the land". Another eyrie upon the tower of the King's House in the capital Armenelos was always inhabited by a pair of eagles, until the days of Tar-Ancalimon and the coming of Shadow to Númenor. Many eagles lived upon the hills around Sorontil in the north of the island. When the Númenóreans began to speak openly against the Ban of the Valar, Manwë appeared as eagle-shaped storm clouds, called the "Eagles of the Lords of the West", to try to reason with or threaten them.

Third Age

By the end of the Third Age, a colony of Eagles lived in the north of the Misty Mountains, as described in The Hobbit. These Eagles opposed the goblins; however, their relationship with the local Woodmen was only cool, as the eagles often hunted their sheep. They rescued Thorin's company from a band of goblins and Wargs, ultimately carrying the dwarves to the Carrock. Later, having seen the mustering of goblins in the Mountains, a great flock of Eagles participated in the Battle of the Five Armies.

In The Lord of the Rings, the Eagles of the Misty Mountains helped the Elves of Rivendell and the Wizard Radagast to gather news of the Orcs. Gwaihir the Windlord carries news to Isengard, rescues the wizard Gandalf from the top of the tower there, and again rescues Gandalf from the top of Celebdil after searching for him at Galadriel's request. and he and his Eagles appear in great numbers towards the end of the book. The Eagles similarly arrive at the Battle of the Morannon, helping the Host of the West against the Nazgûl, while Gwaihir, Landroval, and Meneldor rescue Frodo Baggins and Samwise Gamgee from Mount Doom after the One Ring had been destroyed.

Analysis

Origins 

Tolkien's painting of an eagle on a crag appears in some editions of The Hobbit. According to Christopher Tolkien, the author based this picture on a painting by the Scottish ornithological artist Archibald Thorburn of an immature golden eagle, which Christopher found for him in Thomas Coward's 1919 book The Birds of the British Isles and Their Eggs.

The Great Eagles appeared in "The Fall of Gondolin", the first tale about Middle-earth that Tolkien wrote in the late 1910s. In Tolkien's early writings, the eagles were distinguished from other birds: common birds could keep aloft only within the lower layer of the space above the Earth, while the Eagles of Manwë could fly "beyond the lights of heaven to the edge of darkness". The eagle-shaped clouds that appeared in Númenor formed one of Tolkien's recurring images of the downfall of the island; they appear, too, in his abandoned time-travel stories, The Lost Road and The Notion Club Papers.

Sentient beings

Tolkien faced the question of the Great Eagles' nature with apparent hesitation. In early writings there was no need to define it precisely, since he imagined that, beside the Valar, "many lesser spirits... both great and small" had entered the Eä upon its creation; and such sapient creatures as the Eagles or Huan the Hound, in Tolkien's own words, "have been rather lightly adopted from less 'serious' mythologies".  The phrase "spirits in the shape of hawks and eagles" in The Silmarillion derives from that stage of writing. After completing The Lord of the Rings, Tolkien moved toward a more carefully defined "system" of creatures. At the top were incarnates or Children of Ilúvatar: Elves and Men, those who possessed fëar or souls, with the defining characteristic of being able to speak; next were self-incarnates, the Valar and Maiar, "angelic" spirits that "arrayed" themselves in bodily forms of the incarnates or of animals, and were able to communicate both by thought and speech; and finally animals, mere beasts, unable to speak. For some time Tolkien considered the Eagles as bird-shaped Maiar; however, he realised that the statement about Gwaihir and Landroval's descent from Thorondor had already appeared in print in The Lord of the Rings, while he had long before rejected the notion of their being "Children" of the Valar and Maiar. In the last of his notes on this topic, dated by his son Christopher to the late 1950s, Tolkien decided that the Great Eagles were animals that had been "taught language by the Valar, and raised to a higher level—but they still had no fëar [souls]."

The Tolkien scholars Paul Kocher and Tom Shippey note that in The Hobbit, the narrator provides a firm moral framework, with good elves, evil goblins, and the other peoples like dwarves and eagles somewhere in between. Shippey remarks that the eagles are in the narrator's "euphemistic" words, "not kindly birds". Marjorie Burns comments that the "threat of being eaten [by the Eagle] is so dominant" that the Hobbit Bilbo, who the Eagle described as being rather like a rabbit, is afraid of being torn up and eaten; he is relieved that he is not to become their supper, "but rabbit is precisely what the eagles do bring them for supper".

Norse mythology

In Norse mythology, eagles were associated with the god Odin; for example, he escapes from Jotunheim back to Asgard as an eagle. Burns remarks the similarity with Gandalf, who repeatedly escapes by riding on an eagle. She comments that Tolkien's Eagles, like his Dwarves, Dragons, and Trolls, all signal Norse influence on his stories.

Deus ex machina

Burns notes that Tolkien uses the Eagles three times to save his protagonists: to rescue Bilbo and company in The Hobbit; to lift Gandalf from imprisonment by Saruman in the tower of Orthanc; and finally, to save Frodo and Sam from Mount Doom when they have destroyed the One Ring. The Tolkien scholar Jane Chance describes these interventions as a deus ex machina, a sudden and unexpected mechanism to bring about a eucatastrophe. The screenwriter Brad Johnson, writing in Script, argues that this last deus ex machina instance is a complete surprise to the audience, and undesirable as the sudden appearance of the Eagles "takes the audience out of the scene emotionally". Tolkien was aware of this problem, recognising the risky nature of the mechanism; in one of his letters, he wrote:

Biblical messenger 

Shippey notes that throughout The Lord of the Rings Tolkien carefully avoided direct reference to Christianity, so as not to make the story an allegory. He comments however that in one place "Revelation seems very close and allegory does all but break through", namely the eucatastrophic moment when the Eagle-messenger sings to Faramir about Frodo and Sam's destruction of the One Ring:

Shippey writes that this is certainly Biblical, indeed that it is specifically in the style of Psalm 24 in the King James Version of the Bible, with its phrases "Lift up your heads, O ye gates, and be ye lift up, ye everlasting doors, for the King of glory shall come in". E. L. Risden, making a different connection with Christianity, describes the Eagles' rescue of Frodo and Sam as a "ritual rebirth", and the rescuing bird as "a symbol of the spirit", John the Evangelist's traditional symbol.

Adaptations 

Different adaptations of Tolkien's books treated both the nature of the Eagles and their role in the plots with varying level of faithfulness to originals. The first scenario for an animated motion-picture of The Lord of the Rings proposed to Tolkien in 1957 was turned down because of several cardinal deviations, among which Tolkien's biographer Humphrey Carpenter recorded that "virtually all walking was dispensed with in the story and the Company of the Ring were transported everywhere on the backs of eagles".

According to the fantasy artist Larry Dixon, the digitally animated eagles in Peter Jackson's The Lord of the Rings film trilogy were based on a stuffed golden eagle he had provided to Weta Workshop.

A genus of Diapriid wasps in Australia was named Gwaihiria after the Eagle Gwaihir in 1982.

In the 2011 video game The Lord of the Rings: War in the North, an eagle named Beleram acts as a supporting character, aiding the players in battle.

References

Primary 
This list identifies each item's location in Tolkien's writings.

Secondary

Sources 

 
  
    
 
 
       
 
 
 
 
 
 
 
 
 
 
 
 
 

Middle-earth races
Middle-earth animals
Fictional birds of prey
Talking animals in fiction